James Kyd (1786 – 26 October 1836) was a Master ship builder of the East India Company in Calcutta, Bengal Presidency, India.

Life 
James Kyd was born in 1786 in India to Major Alexander Kyd, a lieutenant general and the Surveyor General of Bengal and his brother is Robert Kyd, a British Army officer. Kyd went to Great Britain to learn shipbuilding and returned to India in 1800 to work as an apprentice to A. Wadell. He succeeded Wadell in 1807 to become the Master ship builder of the East India Company in Calcutta (now, Kolkata). Kyd built various steamers and yachts for the Bengal government and other countries for personal and trading purposes. A collection of few are given below:

In 1814, the Admiralty and Court of Directors sent honors and appreciative testimonial to Kyd for the repair work done to HMS Semiramis at St. Helena. Most of the ships were launched from the Kidderpore docks.

He died on 26 October 1836 due to a knee injury, and was interred at the Scotch Burial Ground.

References 

1786 births
1836 deaths
Indian shipbuilders